Tié-N'Diékro is a town in central Ivory Coast. It is a sub-prefecture and commune of Didiévi Department in Bélier Region, Lacs District.

In 2014, the population of the sub-prefecture of Tié-N'Diékro was 17,450.

Villages
The 15 villages of the sub-prefecture of Tié-N'Diékro and their population in 2014 are:

References

Sub-prefectures of Bélier
Communes of Bélier